The 1997 Copa Norte was the first edition of a football competition held in Brazil, featuring 10 clubs. Acre and Pará have two clubs; Amapá, Amazonas, Maranhão, Piauí, Rondônia and Roraima each have one.

In the finals, Rio Branco defeated Remo 2–1 on aggregate to win their first title and earn the right to play in the 1997 Copa CONMEBOL.

Qualified teams

Group stage

Group A

Group B

Finals

Rio Branco won 2–1 on aggregate.

References

Copa Norte
1997
1997 in Brazilian football